Maria Gambarelli (7 April 1900 – 4 February 1990) was an Italian-American ballerina and actress. She was born in La Spezia, but raised in the United States. Between 1938 and 1941 she was prima ballerina at the Metropolitan Opera. She was considered to be the greatest dancer trained at the Metropolitan Opera ballet school.

Selected filmography

La Fiesta de Santa Barbara (1935)
 Here's to Romance (1935)
 Hooray for Love (1935)
 Doctor Antonio (1937)
 Le Amiche (1955)
 The Prince with the Red Mask (1955)

References

Bibliography
 Salvatore J. LaGumina, Frank J. Cavaioli, Salvatore Primeggia & Joseph A. Varacalli. The Italian American Experience: An Encyclopedia''. Routledge,  2003.

External links

1900 births
1990 deaths
American ballerinas
Italian ballerinas
American film actresses
Italian film actresses
People from La Spezia
Italian emigrants to the United States
20th-century American actresses
20th-century American ballet dancers